The Château de la Mothe-Chandeniers is a castle in the commune of Les Trois-Moutiers in the Vienne department of France.

History
The stronghold dates to the thirteenth century and was originally called Motte Bauçay (or Baussay). The castle is a former stronghold of the Bauçay family, lords of Loudun. The Motte Baussay was taken several times by the English during the Hundred Years' War and devastated during the French Revolution. 

It was bought in 1809 by François Hennecart, a wealthy businessman, and then sold to Baron Joseph Lejeune in 1857. However, a fire in 1932 destroyed most of the buildings in the castle, which then became abandoned. 

In December 2017, a French startup organized a crowdfunding campaign site, and 27,190 people  having to pay at least €50 each joined the cause, raising €1,600,000, to purchase the castle with the aim of preserving it. 

The castle was the subject of a project by the French photographer Roman Veillon in his book Green urbex: Le monde sans nous.

See also
List of castles in France

References

External links

Ruined castles in Nouvelle-Aquitaine
Buildings and structures in Vienne
Ruined castles in France